Main-Spessart is an electoral constituency (German: Wahlkreis) represented in the Bundestag. It elects one member via first-past-the-post voting. Under the current constituency numbering system, it is designated as constituency 249. It is located in northwestern Bavaria, comprising the districts of Main-Spessart and Miltenberg.

Main-Spessart was created for the inaugural 1949 federal election. Since 2013, it has been represented by Alexander Hoffmann of the Christian Social Union (CSU).

Geography
Main-Spessart is located in northwestern Bavaria. As of the 2021 federal election, it comprises the districts of Main-Spessart and Miltenberg.

History
Main-Spessart was created in 1949, then known as Karlstadt. It acquired its current name in the 1976 election. In the 1949 election, it was Bavaria constituency 38 in the numbering system. In the 1953 through 1961 elections, it was number 233. In the 1965 through 1998 elections, it was number 235. In the 2002 and 2005 elections, it was number 250. Since the 2009 election, it has been number 249.

Originally, the constituency comprised the districts of Karlstadt, Bad Brückenau, Gemünden am Main, Hammelburg, Lohr am Main, and Bad Neustadt an der Saale. In the 1965 through 1972 elections, it lost the Bad Neustadt an der Saale district while gaining the Alzenau in Unterfranken and Marktheidenfeld districts. It acquired its current borders in the 1976 election.

Members
Like most constituencies in rural Bavaria, it is an CSU safe seat, the party holding the seat continuously since its creation. It was first represented by Maria Probst from 1949 to 1969, followed by Alfred Biehle from 1969 to 1990. Wolfgang Zöller was representative from 1990 to 2013. Alexander Hoffmann was elected in 2013, and re-elected in 2017 and 2021.

Election results

2021 election

2017 election

2013 election

2009 election

References

Federal electoral districts in Bavaria
1949 establishments in West Germany
Constituencies established in 1949
Main-Spessart
Miltenberg (district)